This is a list of flags used in the modern state of Greece or historically used by Greeks.

National flag

Presidential standard

Royal Standards

Military flags

Hellenic Armed Forces

Hellenic Army

Hellenic Navy

Hellenic Air Force

Hellenic Coast Guard

Regional and municipal flags

Historical flags

Other historical flags

Current and historical variants used outside of Greece

Political flags

Religious flags

Ethnic Group Flags

Yacht clubs of Greece

See also
 List of Cypriot flags
 Flag of Greece

References

External links

 Kokkonis Flag Factory - Historical Flags.
 FotW: Greece
 Origin and Evolution of the Greek Flag, March 2017 (Open Access eBook)

Greece
 
Flags